Jana Kathryn Riess (born December 13, 1969) is an American writer and editor. Riess's writings have focused on American religions, especially the Church of Jesus Christ of Latter-day Saints, of which she is a member, and other new religious movements.

Background
Riess was born in the US Midwest, one of two children. Her father abandoned her mother Phyllis and Jana without warning in 1984 (by that time the brother was on his own).

Riess has a Bachelor's degree from Wellesley College. She received a Master's degree in theology from the Princeton Theological Seminary and a PhD in American Religious studies from Columbia University. Riess is a Religion and American Studies professor at Miami University in Oxford, Ohio. She and husband Phil Smith reside in Cincinnati. A convert to the LDS Church, Riess has spoken at Brigham Young University Women's Conference and other gatherings of the LDS Church, as well as professional conferences.

Writings
Among the books by Riess are What Would Buffy Do? and an abridgment of the Book of Mormon with commentary. Riess is a member of the LDS Church, having converted as an adult. Riess is an expert on religion in literature. In 2001 she moderated a debate over whether the Harry Potter books were a tract for witchcraft. Her "The Next Mormons" survey project looks at how different generations of Mormons have interacted with the Church. In her 2019 The Next Mormons: How Millennials Are Changing the LDS Church, which received critical praise, Riess and her colleague Benjamin Knoll published a landmark analysis which questioned the accuracy of reports that LDS membership was growing. From 1999 to 2008 she was the religion book editor for Publishers Weekly.

Tweeting the Bible
On October 4, 2009, Riess began a project to tweet the bible. Her "Twible" quest concluded in January 2013. Each tweet summarizes a chapter of the bible. Riess tweets the bible in order and plans to hit all 1,189 chapters in 140 characters. She later published it in book form as The Twible: All the Chapters of the Bible in 140 Characters or Less . . . Now with 68% More Humor!

Works

Books

Articles

Other

Footnotes

External links

"Flunking Sainthood" blog on Beliefnet
The Review Revolution: Improving Culture through Kvetching – Jana Riess' blog
@janariess on Twitter

FARMS Review on Riess' abridgment of the Book of Mormon

1969 births
American Latter Day Saint writers
American religion academics
Columbia University alumni
Converts to Mormonism
Living people
Mormon studies scholars
Mormon memoirists
Writers from Cincinnati
Princeton Theological Seminary alumni
Wellesley College alumni
20th-century American writers
21st-century American non-fiction writers
20th-century American women writers
21st-century American women writers
Latter Day Saints from Ohio